is a Ryukyuan gusuku in Nanjō, Okinawa.

Description
Kakinohana Castle is a kuruwa style fortification on a hill overlooking the Pacific Ocean. The stone walls are built in the nozura (stacked stone) style.  No accurate details of the construction of this castle exist, but legend states it that it was built by the second son of Minton Aji, an Okinawan ruler around the 14th century.

References

External links
 Information and directions for the spring 
 An informational YouTube video of the spring 
 A scenic YouTube video of the spring
 Kakinohana Gusuku 

Castles in Okinawa Prefecture